The Gongguoqiao Dam is a gravity dam on the Lancang (Mekong) River in Yunlong County of Yunnan Province, China. The primary purpose of the dam is hydroelectric power generation. Construction began in 2008, and the river was diverted around the dam site in 2009. The next year concrete placement began, and in 2011 the first generator was commissioned. The 900 MW power station was fully operational on 21 June 2012.

See also

Hydropower in the Mekong River Basin
List of dams and reservoirs in China
List of tallest dams in China

References

Dams in China
Dams in the Mekong River Basin
Gravity dams
Hydroelectric power stations in Yunnan
Buildings and structures in Dali Bai Autonomous Prefecture
Dams completed in 2011
Energy infrastructure completed in 2012
Roller-compacted concrete dams